Michal Mařík (born May 18, 1975) is a Czech former professional ice hockey goaltender.

Mařík played a total of 312 games in the Czech Extraliga over 12 seasons from 1993 to 2005. He played for HC Plzeň, HC Karlovy Vary, Motor České Budějovice, HC Zlín, HC Oceláři Třinec, HC Havířov Panthers, HC Litvínov and HC Vítkovice. He also played in the GET-ligaen for Stjernen Hockey.

Mařík played in the 1995 World Junior Ice Hockey Championships for the Czech Republic.

References

External links

1975 births
Living people
Adendorfer EC players
HC Baník Sokolov players
Motor České Budějovice players
Czech ice hockey goaltenders
Dresdner Eislöwen players
HC Havířov players
KLH Vajgar Jindřichův Hradec players
HC Karlovy Vary players
HC Litvínov players
BK Mladá Boleslav players
HC Most players
People from Tábor
IHC Písek players
HC Plzeň players
HC Oceláři Třinec players
Stjernen Hockey players
HC Vítkovice players
PSG Berani Zlín players
Sportspeople from the South Bohemian Region
Czech expatriate ice hockey players in Germany
Czech expatriate sportspeople in Norway
Expatriate ice hockey players in Norway